Love of Serafim Frolov  is a 1968 Soviet romantic drama directed by Semyon Tumanov.

Plot 
Soldier Serafim Frolov (Leonid Kuravlyov) returning from the front after the War, decided to go to the girl Nastya (Tamara Syomina), whom he had known only through correspondence. However, Nastya does not want him, because she can't forget her fiancée, who died at the front. Serafim decides to leave, but then he returns, hoping that Nastya loves him. He gets a job in the same village, he meets a nurse Anfisa, who returned from the front (Larisa Luzhina), and he helps to a Maria, mother of many children (Zhanna Prokhorenko). Anfisa, which husband is cheating on her, clearly shows to Serafim, that she likes him, but Serafim likes Maria: he believes that she needs his help. So, without obtaining reciprocity from Nasty, Serafim goes to Maria. Maria makes it clear that for Serafim it is better to go back to the Nastya. Serafim returns to her, and Nastya happily greets him.

Cast 
 Leonid Kuravlyov as Serafim Frolov
 Tamara Syomina as  Nastya
 Larisa Luzhina as Anfisa
 Gennadi Yukhtin as Anfisa's husband
 Pavel Shprigfelt as Nastya's grandfather
 Zhanna Prokhorenko as Maria
 Alexandra Denisova as apartment owner
 Alexander Kavalerov as Sashka
 Nikolay Khlibko (episode)

Film credits 
 Director: Semyon Tumanov
 Screenwriter: Nikolay Evdokimov
 Composer: Vladimir Rubin
 Costumier: Georgy Turilev

References

External links
 Love of Serafim Frolov movie on Ruskino.ru
 Love of Serafim Frolov movie on Imdb.com

1968 romantic drama films
Soviet romantic drama films
Russian romantic drama films
1968 films
1960s Russian-language films